Hayden Wilson Birrell (1923 – 24 December 1994), was an Australian politician.

He was born in Geelong to accountant Stanley Wilson Birrell and Alice Hayden George. He was educated at Chilwell and then at Geelong College, graduating at fourteen to become an accountant. He served in the Citizen Military Forces from 1939 to 1941 and in the Royal Australian Navy from 1941 to 1946, in which he was a petty officer. He subsequently returned to work for the State Savings Bank of Victoria, and joined the Liberal Party in 1950, partly motivated by the Labor Party's policy of bank nationalisation. In 1961 he was elected to the Victorian Legislative Assembly for Geelong. He moved seats to Geelong West in 1976 and served until 1982. On 2 June 1945 he had married Rae Langley Crouch, with whom he had two children. He died in 1994.

References

1923 births
1994 deaths
Liberal Party of Australia members of the Parliament of Victoria
Members of the Victorian Legislative Assembly
20th-century Australian politicians
Australian Army personnel of World War II
Royal Australian Navy personnel of World War II
Royal Australian Navy sailors